T41 may refer to:

 T-41, a variant of the T-37A tank, an interwar years Soviet Union tank
 T-41 Mescalero, a United States military version of the popular Cessna 172 used as trainer aircraft
 T.41 Skylark 2, a model of the Slingsby Skylark glider
 T41 pre-production model of the American M41 Walker Bulldog light tank
 T41, La Porte Municipal Airport (Texas) FAA LID
 ThinkPad T41, a model of laptops made by IBM
 T41 Bugatti Royale, a pre-war large luxury car
 T41 (classification), classification code for disability athletics